Trevor Devall (born November 10, 1972) is a Canadian-American voice actor and podcaster. He worked for various other studios in Vancouver, British Columbia, Canada for years, before he relocated to Los Angeles, California, US in 2013.

Early life
Trevor Devall was born on November 10, 1972, grew up in Edmonton, Alberta and was the youngest of five siblings. He was into theatre and did tap, jazz and Polynesian dance as a child. He attended the University of Alberta for drama and directed stage productions as well as student films.

Devall moved to Vancouver in 1998 to pursue a film directing career. While working for a talent agency, he made a demo tape for them and began landing work as a voice actor.

Career
He is best known for voicing Hot Dog in Krypto the Superdog, Rocket Raccoon in the animated TV series Guardians of the Galaxy, Emperor Palpatine in Lego Star Wars, Pyro in X-Men: Evolution, Dukey in seasons 5 and 6 of Johnny Test (Taking over the role from Louis Chirillo), and various characters in the Netflix original series F Is for Family, as well as providing voices in English-language versions of various anime series, most notably as Mu La Flaga from Mobile Suit Gundam SEED, Mukotsu from InuYasha, Scourge from Transformers: Cybertron, Mr. Chang from Black Lagoon, and Aizawa from Death Note. He also voiced Hermiod on Stargate Atlantis and Ravus Nox Fleuret in the Final Fantasy XV video game and Kingsglaive: Final Fantasy XV feature film. Other than that, he voiced Mars in Dota 2 video game. On camera, he played Sir Atticus Moon in Big Time Movie.
Devall played the voice of Rocket Raccoon in Marvel's animated Guardians of the Galaxy in 2015.

Filmography

Animation

3-2-1 Penguins – Flam Mingo
A Kind of Magic - Gregor
Action Dad – Nun Chuck, Red Skarf, Dr. Pincushion, Brick Brac, Mick's Belt Buckle, Rocky, Bomb, Scud, Red Skarf (Young), NunChuck (Young), See & Say, Cop #2 (2), Additional Voices
Animaniacs (2020) – Additional Voices
Animism: The Gods' Lake – Stevens, Nazi Biker (Ep. "The Hero's Journey... With Friends")
Avengers Assemble – Rocket Raccoon (2nd voice), Ares
Being Ian – Craig, Nash, Brad, 80's Station Disk Jockey, Additional Voices
Blaze and the Monster Machines – Wartimer
Bratz – Eitan
Breadwinners – Trash Bandit, Oonski's Father, Super Duck, Captain Scurvybeak
Carmen Sandiego - Roundabout
Cat Burglar - Museum Director
Class of the Titans – Apollo, Hades, King Minos, Thanatos, Adonis
Costume Quest - Grubbin Levi, Chad, Announcer, Bodyguard #1, Crowd, Dave Grubbin, Dave Monster, Camera Man, KAHN News Announcer, Male Security Guard, Grubbin, Grubbins, Monster, Monster Chad, Security Guard, Old Folk
Dinosaur Train – Boris Tyrannosaurus, Mr. Deinonychus, Thurston Troodon, Bucky Masiakasaurus
Dinotrux – Garby, Skrap-It, Lloyd, Scoot, Craneosaur #1 (3)
Dragon Booster – Moordryd Paynn, Captain Faier, Wulph, Shadow Booster
Dreamkix – Sean, Pontelette, Maurice, Rabbit Anchor, Auditioning Rabbit
Elena of Avalor – Nathaniel
Fantastic Four: World's Greatest Heroes - Diablo
F Is for Family – Holtenwasser, Red the Baggage Handler, Bolo, Greg, Mr. Goomer, Bing Crosby TV Announcer, Game Show Announcer, Cement Worker, Raymond Trentelle / Irish Cop, Carnival Ring Toss Employee, Additional Voices
Firehouse Tales – Additional Voices
Guardians of the Galaxy – Rocket Raccoon, Black Bolt, Fandral, Grand Commissioner, Welcome Announcer, Village Elder, Automated Voice (1), Chitauri Guard, Ranger, Spartax Soldier #1, L'Rik, Imperial Guard, Rocco, Jarhead, Sakaaran Sentry #2, Faux Gamora, Ravager, Ghost of Christmas Past, Automated Voice (4), Arokine, Red Scarf Empathetic, Zombies, Gate Operator, Klyntar Rocket Raccoon, Karl Sentry Commander, Sentry Leader, Patron #1, Automated Jail Cell Voice, Automated Game Voice, Nova Corps Operator, Shiny Pilot, N.O.V.A.S. Announcer, Guard #1, Ship's Automated Voice, Nova Corpsman #2 (2), Alien Father, Additional Voices
Hanazuki: Full of Treasures – Basil Ganglia
Hero: 108 – Spotter, Nain
He-Man and the Masters of the Universe - Beast Man / R’Qazz, Bash
Hydee and the Hytops – Zeke in The Snake Claws
I Am Groot - Iwua
Inhumans Motion Comics – Stalyenko, Alpha 1, Namor the Sub-Mariner, Rexel Toiven
Jeff and Some Aliens - Anchor
Johnny Test – Dukey the Dog (Seasons 5-6), Mr. Teacherman (Season 5), Additional Voices (Season 2)
Johnny Test Dukey the Dog, Police Chief, Mr. Teacherman, Man Butler, Upbeat Announcer, Barker, Meatloaf Man, Santa, Centurion 2, Driver, Fofo, Coach Gruff, Bicyclist, Granny Big Bad Wolf, Pig 2, Drone 1, TV Executive, Male Assistant, Kid 5, Duke-A-Don, Little Kid, Mickey Crashola, Jimmy Crashola
Justice League Action – Cain, Jonah Hex
Kid vs. Kat – Burt Burtonburger
Krypto the Superdog – Hot Dog
Lego Star Wars: Droid Tales – Emperor Sheev Palpatine, Admiral Ackbar, Jar Jar Binks, Jango Fett, Tion Medon, Boba Fett, Garbagedroids, Battledroids, Nien Nunb, Scout Trooper 2, AT-ST Pilot, Bib Fortuna, Additional Voices
Lego Star Wars: The Freemaker Adventures – Emperor Sheev Palpatine, TIE Fighter Pilot, X-Wing Pilot #3, Stormtrooper #3, RA-7 Droid, Stormtrooper #2, Pod Race Driver, Pirate #1, Super Battle Droid #2, Gungan, Admiral Ackbar, Citizen, Rebel Tech #2, Officer, Pilot, Stormtrooper #1, 4-LOM, Master Kantoo, Additional Voices
Lego Star Wars: The Yoda Chronicles – Emperor Sheev Palpatine, Ackbar, Bib Fortuna, Tion Medon, Salacious Crumb, Jar Jar Binks, Admiral Piett, Royal Guard
Marvel Super Hero Adventures – Rocket Raccoon
Max Steel – Jim McGrath, Metal Elementor, Mega Elementor
Miles from Tomorrowland – Galaxel
My Little Pony: Friendship Is Magic – Thunderlane, Iron Will, Fancy Pants, Fedora-Wearing Clover Pony, Hoity Toity, Luggage Cart, Hayseed Turnip Truck, Golden Gavel, Mr. Zippy, Instructional Film Announcer, Fluffy Clouds, Additional Voices
My Little Pony: Pony Life – Gummy, TV Producer Pony, Fancy Pants
Regular Show – HD DVD, Stream Box Bot 1
Scooby-Doo and Guess Who? - Max Kilobyte, Cameraman, Weatherly
Slugterra – The King of Sling, Vance Volt, The Gentleman, Waiter, Additional Voices
Sofia the First – Gunk, Sir Henley, Additional Voices
Spider-Man - Blizzard, Cop #1 (2), Jewelry Store Clerk, Paladin, Construction Worker #2 (1)
SpongeBob SquarePants – Additional Voices
Star Wars Rebels – Hobbie, Additional Voices
Superbook - Marianus, Eliab, Jesse, Jodas, Vendor, Joshua, Captain of the Guard, Guard, Older Brother, Pharisee 2, Aaron's Dad, Hatach, King Xerxes, Young Servant, Mourners and Followers, Pilate
Supernoobs – Count Venamus
Teen Titans Go! – Old Man, Spy Villain, Whimsy Starfire, Whimsy Beast Boy
The Deep - Devil Daniels, Fisherman #2
The Epic Tales of Captain Underpants – Smartsy Fartsy
The Ghost and Molly McGee - Weird Larry, Irving the Illusionist
The Little Prince – Coppelius (The Planet of the Oracle), Joseph (The Planet of Libris), Zig (The Planet of Carapodes)
The Loud House – Carnival Manager, Carnival Worker, Teen Carny, Basketball Referee, Prisoner, Bulldozer Driver, News Crew Member, Obnoxious Guy, Fast Food Waiter, Additional Voices
The Powerpuff Girls – Additional Voices
The Tom and Jerry Show - Toodles' Dad, Stinker, Clerk, Shop Owner, Delivery Guy, Donnie, Gerald, The Invisible Cat, Police Chief, Western Narrator, Lawyer
ThunderCats Roar – Slithe, Safari Joe
Tom and Jerry Tales - Radio Announcer, Thomas Jefferson, El Presidente
Transformers: Robots in Disguise – Hermit, Patrolman #2
TripTank – Edmund, Billy John
Ultimate Spider-Man – Rocket Raccoon (2nd voice)
Ultimate Wolverine vs. Hulk Motion Comics – Steve Rogers, S.H.I.E.L.D. Agent, George
VeggieTales – Espresso, Old Man Zucchini
Vixen – Drake, Jones
Voltron: Legendary Defender – Antok, Keith's Dad, Galra Druid
Wolverine: Weapon X Motion Comics – Captain America/Bucky Barnes, Nightcrawler, Cyclops, Luke Cage, David Heimerdinger, Guard #2
Wolverine vs. Sabretooth Motion Comics – Sasquatch, Captain America, Professor Thorton, Cyclops
X-Men: Evolution – St. John Allerdyce/Pyro
Zeke's Pad – Alvin Palmer, Ike Palmer, RJ Sloan, Stanley Steele, News Reader, Sketch, Peter, Calvin, Izzy, Bouncer, Additional Voices

Anime

Aggretsuko - Himuro
Ayakashi: Samurai Horror Tales – Odajima, Yahei
Black Lagoon series – Mr. Chang, Leigharch, Yoshida, Neo-Nazi 1 (Ep. 6), NGO Worker (Ep. 7), Thai Man (Ep. 8) (also Roberta's Blood Trail OVAs
Brain Powered – Edgar
Cannon Busters – Quizmaster, Fetter, Batty, Additional Voices
Death Note – Shuichi Aizawa, Shingo Midou
Elemental Gelade – Gladias
Earth Maiden Arjuna – Black S.E.E.D. Soldier, Dance Mania Electric Hour DJ, Doctor, Power Plant Controller #1, S.E.E.D. HQ Controller, S.E.E.D. Official #4, White S.E.E.D. Soldier
Galaxy Angel A – Octopus (Ep. 21)
Ghost in the Shell: Stand Alone Complex OVAs – Togusa
Great Pretender – James Coleman
Hamtaro – Kana's Father (Conrad Iwata)
Hikaru No Go – America's Representative, Kosuke's Grandfather, Toshiki Adachi
Human Crossing – Michio Midorikawa, Cafe Owner, Kamano, Man at Party A, Shimada
Infinite Ryvius – Analyst
Inuyasha – Genbu, Ryūkotsusei, Mukotsu, Samurai Leader (Ep. 5), Satsuki's Brother, Shako, Shima's Father, Shinosuke, Villager (Ep. 1), Rōrō (Ep. 102)
Kurozuka – Karuta, Man in Black
Last Hope – Hao Wang
Little Witch Academia – Mr. Holbrooke, Police Officer (Ep. 9)
Maison Ikkoku – Restaurant Owner
Marvel Future Avengers – Loki
Master Keaton – Olaf Helmer (Ep. 35), Adult Student, Conductor, Franco, Reporter
MegaMan NT Warrior – Mr. Match, Heimlich, Drillman
MegaMan NT Warrior Axess – Mr. Match, Dr. Regal, Mystery Man
Melty Lancer – Additional Voices
Mirmo! – Sazo
Mobile Suit Gundam – Tem Ray
Mobile Suit Gundam SEED – Mu La Flaga
Mobile Suit Gundam SEED Destiny – Neo Roanoke, Mu La Flaga
Mobile Suit Gundam 00 – Patrick Colasour, Howard Mason
Nurse Witch Komugi – Shiro Mibu
Ōban Star-Racers – Ondai
Powerpuff Girls Z – Principal, various
Project ARMS – Claw
Ranma ½ – Mushroom Temple Lord
Ronin Warriors – Fight Announcer (Message), Gas Station Attendant (Legend of the Inferno Armor), Police Officer (Legend of the Inferno Armor), Radio DJ (Legend of the Inferno Armor), Show Promoter (Message), UN Rep (Message), Uncle Chin (Gaiden)
Saint Seiya: The Lost Canvas – The Myth of Hades – Griffon Minos
Shakugan no Shana – Friagne, Marcosias (Season 1)
Silent Möbius – Ganossa Maximillian
Star Ocean EX – Ernest Raviede, Gyoro, Mars Elder, Shaizen, Additional Voices
Tetsujin 28-go – Kaneda, Man in Black
The SoulTaker – Shiro Mibu
The Story of Saiunkoku – Enjun Sa (young), Guard 1, Official 2, Sa Family Member 3, Soldier 3
Tokyo Underground – Emilia's Uncle, Officer, Researcher
Transformers: Cybertron – Scourge, Megatron (Fallen)
Transformers: Energon – Alpha Q, All The Terrorcon Units, Bruticus Maximus
Zoids: New Century Zero – Backdraft Official
Zoids: Fuzors – Rotten Roger

Live-action
Big Time Movie – Atticus Moon
Stargate Atlantis – Hermiod
Stargate SG-1 – Kvasir

Films

Junkers Come Here – Photographer (English dub)
Mobile Suit Gundam: Char's Counterattack – Adenaur Paraya (English dub)

Video games
Agents of Mayhem – Agent Hollywood (Rod Stone)
Dota 2 – Mars
Fallout 76: Steel Dawn - Brotherhood Hopefuls/Initiates
Final Fantasy XV – Ravus Nox Fleuret 
Final Fantasy VII Remake – Andrea Rhodea
Frogger's Adventures: The Rescue – Ranger Frog, TRIP Boss
Frogger: Ancient Shadow – Dr. Wani, Mohan
Halo 5: Guardians – Additional voices
Infamous First Light – Additional voices
Mafia III – Additional voices
Marvel Powers United VR – Rocket Raccoon, Kree Soldier
Marvel vs. Capcom: Infinite – Rocket Raccoon
Mass Effect: Andromeda – Additional voices
Mobile Suit Gundam: Encounters in Space – Orteg 
Rise of the Tomb Raider – Additional voices
Skylanders: Imaginators – Buckshot
Trinity: Souls of Zill Ơll – Orphaus
Under the Skin – Walla Group

Voiceprint
Since 2007, Devall produced his own podcast, Voiceprint with Trevor Devall & Guests, where he interviewed fellow Vancouver-based voice actors and answered questions from fans. Each episode featured a different voice actor as the episode guest, though some episodes featured other people in the voice-acting business that may not actually be voice actors themselves; or behind-the-scenes looks at the life of a voice actor. Topics usually included how the guest made it into the voice-acting business, what it is like working in the industry, and the general lifestyle of a voice actor. The series concluded its first season after 36 episodes in December 2013. The second season was announced in the final episode of season 1, as Trevor moves to Los Angeles, California to continue his career and the show.

Web series 
Devall runs a web series in which he plays various table-top role-playing games for himself as both player and game master with the world and narrative generated on the fly as he plays. He has played a different game in each season of the series and has thus far played with the Savage Worlds, Ironsworn, and Dominion Rules systems. The series is currently in its 3rd season.

 Me, Myself and Die! – Player, GM, and Host

References

External links

Trevor Devall at the CrystalAcids Anime Voice Actor Database

Trevor Devall interview with Super Hero Speak
Me, Myself and Die!

1972 births
Living people
Canadian expatriates in the United States
Canadian male video game actors
American male video game actors
Canadian male voice actors
American male voice actors
Canadian podcasters
American podcasters
Canadian people of French descent
American people of French-Canadian descent
Male actors from Edmonton
Male actors from Los Angeles
Male actors from Vancouver
Naturalized citizens of the United States
21st-century Canadian male actors
21st-century American male actors